Eugenio Constantino Calderón 
“El Chele calderon” (born 21 May 1963) is a former professional Mexican footballer active in the Primera División from 1984 to 1996.

Career
Born in Zacapu, Michoacán, Calderón spent most of his life in Morelia. He played for CD Irapuato, Cruz Azul, UANL Tigres, Guadalajara and Club America. Calderón ended his career as a midfielder in the Ascenso MX team Correcaminos UAT. He scored 39 Primera División goals during his career.

References

External links

1963 births
Living people
Footballers from Michoacán
Mexican footballers
People from Zacapu
Association football midfielders
Irapuato F.C. footballers
Cruz Azul footballers
Tigres UANL footballers
C.D. Guadalajara footballers
C.F. Pachuca players
Correcaminos UAT footballers